Lhasa Tibetan, or Standard Tibetan, is the Tibetan dialect spoken by educated people of Lhasa, the capital of the Tibetan Autonomous Region of China. It is an official language of the Tibet Autonomous Region.

In the traditional "three-branched" classification of the Tibetic languages, the Lhasa dialect belongs to the Central Tibetan branch (the other two being Khams Tibetan and Amdo Tibetan). In terms of mutual intelligibility, speakers of Khams Tibetan are able to communicate at a basic level with Lhasa Tibetan, while Amdo speakers cannot. Both Lhasa Tibetan and Khams Tibetan evolved to become tonal and do not preserve the word-initial consonant clusters, which makes them very far from Classical Tibetan, especially when compared to the more conservative Amdo Tibetan.

Registers 
Like many languages, Lhasa Tibetan has a variety of language registers:
  (Wylie: , literally "demotic language"): the vernacular speech.
  (Wylie: , "honorifics or deference, courtesy"): the formal spoken style, particularly prominent in Lhasa.
  (Wylie: , literally "doctrine language" or "religious language"): the literary style in which the scriptures and other classical works are written.

Grammar

Syntax and word order 
Tibetan is an ergative language. Grammatical constituents broadly have head-final word order:
 adjectives generally follow nouns in Tibetan, unless the two are linked by a genitive particle
 objects and adverbs precede the verb, as do adjectives in copular clauses
 a noun marked with the genitive case precedes the noun which it modifies
 demonstratives and numerals follow the noun they modify

Numerals 

Unlike many other languages of East Asia  and especially Chinese, another Sino-Tibetan language, there are no numeral auxiliaries or measure words used in counting in Tibetan although words expressive of a collective or integral are often used after the tens, sometimes after a smaller number.

In scientific and astrological works, the numerals, as in Vedic Sanskrit, are expressed by symbolical words.

Writing system 

Tibetan is written with an Indic script, with a historically conservative orthography that reflects Old Tibetan phonology and helps unify the Tibetan-language area. It is also helpful in reconstructing Proto Sino-Tibetan and Old Chinese.

Wylie transliteration is the most common system of romanization used by Western scholars in rendering written Tibetan using the Latin alphabet (such as employed on much of this page), while linguists tend to use other special transliteration systems of their own.  As for transcriptions meant to approximate the pronunciation, Tibetan pinyin is the official romanization system employed by the government of the People's Republic of China, while English language materials use the THL transcription system. Certain names may also retain irregular transcriptions, such as Chomolungma for Mount Everest.

Phonology 
The following summarizes the sound system of the dialect of Tibetan spoken in Lhasa, the most influential variety of the spoken language.

Vowels 
Tournadre and Sangda Dorje describe eight vowels in the standard language:

These sounds normally occur in closed syllables; because Tibetan does not allow geminated consonants, there are cases in which one syllable ends with the same sound as the one following it. The result is that the first is pronounced as an open syllable but retains the vowel typical of a closed syllable. For instance, zhabs (foot) is pronounced  and pad (borrowing from Sanskrit padma, lotus) is pronounced , but the compound word, zhabs pad is pronounced . This process can result in minimal pairs involving sounds that are otherwise allophones.

Phonemic vowel length exists in Lhasa Tibetan but in a restricted set of circumstances. Assimilation of Classical Tibetan's suffixes, normally ‘i (འི་), at the end of a word produces a long vowel in Lhasa Tibetan; the feature is sometimes omitted in phonetic transcriptions. In normal spoken pronunciation, a lengthening of the vowel is also frequently substituted for the sounds  and  when they occur at the end of a syllable.

Tones 
The Lhasa dialect is usually described as having two tones: high and low. However, in monosyllabic words, each tone can occur with two distinct contours. The high tone can be pronounced with either a flat or a falling contour, and the low tone can be pronounced with either a flat or rising-falling contour, the latter being a tone that rises to a medium level before falling again. It is normally safe to distinguish only between the two tones because there are very few minimal pairs that differ only because of contour. The difference occurs only in certain words ending in the sounds [m] or [ŋ]; for instance, the word kham ("piece") is pronounced  with a high flat tone, whereas the word Khams ("the Kham region") is pronounced  with a high falling tone.

In polysyllabic words, tone is not important except in the first syllable. This means that from the point of view of phonological typology, Tibetan could more accurately be described as a pitch-accent language than a true tone language, in the latter of which all syllables in a word can carry their own tone.

Consonants

 In the low tone, the unaspirated  are voiced , whereas the aspirated stops and affricates  lose some of their aspiration. The dialect of the upper social strata in Lhasa does not use voiced stops and affricates in the low tone.
 The alveolar trill is in complementary distribution of the alveolar approximant ; therefore, both are treated as one phoneme.
 The voiceless alveolar lateral approximant  resembles the voiceless alveolar lateral fricative  found in languages such as Welsh and Zulu and is sometimes transcribed .
The Classical Tibetan final  is still present, but its modern pronunciation is normally realized as a nasalisation of the preceding vowel, rather than as a discrete consonant (see above). However,  is not pronounced in the final position of a word except in very formal speech. For instance, the word for Tibet itself was Bod in Classical Tibetan but is now pronounced  in the Lhasa dialect.

Verbal system 
The Lhasa Tibetan verbal system distinguishes four tenses and three evidential moods.

The three moods may all occur with all three grammatical persons, though early descriptions associated the personal modal category with European first-person agreement.

Counting system 
Lhasa Tibetan has a base-10 counting system. The basic units of the counting system of Lhasa Tibetan is given in the table below in both the Tibetan script and a Romanisation for those unfamiliar with Written Tibetan.

Scholarship 
In the 18th and 19th centuries several Western linguists arrived in Tibet:
 The Capuchin friars who settled in Lhasa for a quarter of century from 1719:
 Francesco della Penna, well known from his accurate description of Tibet,
 Cassian di Macerata sent home materials which were used by the Augustine friar Aug. Antonio Georgi of Rimini (1711–1797) in his Alphabetum Tibetanum (Rome, 1762, 4t0), a ponderous and confused compilation, which may be still referred to, but with great caution.
 The Hungarian Sándor Kőrösi Csoma (1784–1842), who published the first Tibetan–European language dictionary (Classical Tibetan and English in this case) and grammar, Essay Towards a Dictionary, Tibetan and English.
 Heinrich August Jäschke of the Moravian mission which was established in Ladakh in 1857, Tibetan Grammar and A Tibetan–English Dictionary.
 At St Petersburg, Isaac Jacob Schmidt published his Grammatik der tibetischen Sprache in 1839 and his Tibetisch-deutsches Wörterbuch in 1841. His access to Mongolian sources had enabled him to enrich the results of his labours with a certain amount of information unknown to his predecessors. His Tibetische Studien (1851–1868) is a valuable collection of documents and observations.
 In France, P. E. Foucaux published in 1847 a translation from the Rgya tcher rol-pa, the Tibetan version of the Lalita Vistara, and in 1858 a Grammaire thibétaine.
 Ant. Schiefner of St Petersburg in 1849 his series of translations and researches.
 Theos Casimir Bernard, a PhD scholar of religion from Columbia University, explorer and practitioner of Yoga and Tibetan Buddhism, published, after his 1936/37 trip to India and Tibet, . See the 'Books' section.

Indian indologist and linguist Rahul Sankrityayan wrote a Tibetan grammar in Hindi. Some of his other works on Tibetan were:
 Tibbati Bal-Siksha, 1933
 Pathavali (Vols. 1, 2, 3), 1933
 Tibbati Vyakaran, 1933
 Tibbat May Budh Dharm, 1948

 Japanese linguist Kitamura Hajime published a grammar and dictionary of Lhasa Tibetan

Contemporary usage 
In much of Tibet, primary education is conducted either primarily or entirely in the Tibetan language, and bilingual education is rarely introduced before students reach middle school. However, Chinese is the language of instruction of most Tibetan secondary schools. In April 2020, classroom instruction was switched from Tibetan to Mandarin Chinese in Ngaba, Sichuan. Students who continue on to tertiary education have the option of studying humanistic disciplines in Tibetan at a number of minority colleges in China. This contrasts with Tibetan schools in Dharamsala, India, where the Ministry of Human Resource Development curriculum requires academic subjects to be taught in English from middle school. Literacy and enrollment rates continue to be the main concern of the Chinese government. Much of the adult population in Tibet remains illiterate, and despite compulsory education policies, many parents in rural areas are unable to send their children to school.

In February 2008, Norman Baker, a UK MP, released a statement to mark International Mother Language Day claiming, "The Chinese government are following a deliberate policy of extinguishing all that is Tibetan, including their own language in their own country" and he asserted a right for Tibetans to express themselves "in their mother tongue". However, Tibetologist Elliot Sperling has noted that "within certain limits the PRC does make efforts to accommodate Tibetan cultural expression" and "the cultural activity taking place all over the Tibetan plateau cannot be ignored."

Some scholars also question such claims because most Tibetans continue to reside in rural areas where Chinese is rarely spoken, as opposed to Lhasa and other Tibetan cities where Chinese can often be heard. In the Texas Journal of International Law, Barry Sautman stated that "none of the many recent studies of endangered languages deems Tibetan to be imperiled, and language maintenance among Tibetans contrasts with language loss even in the remote areas of Western states renowned for liberal policies... claims that primary schools in Tibet teach Mandarin are in error. Tibetan was the main language of instruction in 98% of TAR primary schools in 1996; today, Mandarin is introduced in early grades only in urban schools.... Because less than four out of ten TAR Tibetans reach secondary school, primary school matters most for their cultural formation."

Machine translation software and applications 
An incomplete list of machine translation software or applications that can translate Tibetan language from/to a variety of other languages.

 藏译通 - Zangyitong, a mobile app for translating between Tibetan and Chinese.
 青海弥陀翻译 – A Beta-version WeChat Mini Program that translate between Tibetan language to/from Chinese. (invitation from WeChat users only)
 腾讯民汉翻译 – A WeChat Mini Program that translate between Tibetan language to/from Chinese.
 THL Tibetan to English Translation Tool - A webpage that annotates Tibetan text various English meanings and translations, with 10+ dictionaries integrated. A downloadable version is also available.
 中国社科院 藏汉(口语)机器翻译 - A demonstrative website (slow in response) translating Tibetan to Chinese, developed by Chinese Academy of Social Sciences. It works well on Tibetan text from official Chinese News websites.
 Panlex - A multilingual translation website with a few Tibetan words.
 Microsoft Translator - Has a Option to Translate Tibetan.

See also 

 Central Tibetan
 Amdo Tibetan
 Khams Tibetan
 Languages of Bhutan

Notes

References

Further reading 
 
 . Reprinted by Motilal Banarsidass, Delhi, .
 
  " ... contains a facsimile of the original publication in manuscript, the first printed version of 1883, and the later Addenda published with the Third Edition."—P. [4] of cover./ First edition published in Kye-Lang in Brit. Lahoul by the author, in manuscript, in 1865.
 (Original from Oxford University)
 
 
 Kopp, Teresa Kunkel. 1998. Verbalizers in Lhasa Tibetan. PhD dissertation, University of Texas at Arlington.
 
 Naga, Sangye Tandar. (2010). "Some Reflections on the Mysterious Nature of Tibetan Language" In: The Tibet Journal, Special issue. Autumn 2009 vol XXXIV n. 3-Summer 2010 vol XXXV n. 2. "The Earth Ox Papers", edited by Roberto Vitali, pp. 561–566.
 (Original from Harvard University)
 
 Hahn, Michael. "Foundational Questions of Tibetan Morphology." The Tibet Journal, vol. 33, no. 2, 1 July 2008, pp. 3–19.
 Review of Becoming Bilingual in School and Home in Tibetan Areas of China: Stories of Struggle (2018). China Review International, Vol. 25, No. 1, 48–53.

External links 

 Translations of Tibetan texts, Tibetan language courses & publications by Erick Tsiknopoulos and the Trikāya Translation Committee.

Languages of China
Central Bodish languages
Languages of Tibet
Languages of Nepal
Languages written in Tibetan script
Sacred languages